Ramgopal Mancha  is a theatre auditorium located in Howrah, West Bengal, India. It is owned by Howrah Sanskrit Sahitya Samaj and named after one of the founders of Howrah Sanskrit Sahitya Samaj - Pundit Ramgopal Mukhopadhyay Smritiratna.

The hall has Air Conditioning facility, capacity is about 300. Many theatre troops perform here regularly, namely, Natadha, Kolkata Romroma, 4th Bell Theatres, Theatre Formation Paribartak, Howrah Anubhash, Manchak etc.

External links
Website of Howrah Sanskrit Sahitya Samaj: http://www.hsss.org.in

Bengali theatre
Bengali culture
Culture of Kolkata
Theatres in Kolkata